"If You Want My Love" is a song by the American rock band Cheap Trick, which was released in 1982 as the first single from their sixth studio album One on One. It was written by guitarist Rick Nielsen and produced by Roy Thomas Baker. It reached No. 45 on the Billboard Hot 100 Chart and almost topped the Australian chart, where it peaked at No. 2 for two weeks.

The song was the first single release from the band to feature new bassist Jon Brant. A music video was filmed to promote the single, which received regular airing on MTV. The single's B-side, "Four Letter Word", was featured as the closing track on One on One, and was written by Rick Nielsen and Robin Zander.

A live version of "If You Want My Love" was performed at the band's 25th anniversary concert in Rockford, Illinois during 1999. The performance saw Brant rejoining Cheap Trick on stage to play bass on the track, along with "She's Tight". The concert was later released in 2001 as Silver. Speaking of the song in an interview featured on the Silver DVD, bassist Tom Petersson stated that it was "the best Beatle song we ever recorded". He, however, was referring to Cheap Trick as a band, as he had not been with the group at the time the track was originally recorded.

The song is used in the films Joe Dirt and Super.

Critical reception
Upon release, Billboard felt the song showed the more "romantic side" to the band and commented: "Robin Zander's vocals is anything but timid though, while Rick Nielsen's massed acoustic and electric guitars add widescreen scale." Cash Box wrote: "A dense yet extremely melodic confection, this tune marks somewhat of a return to the more Beatlesque sound which graced the band's earlier LPs."

Critic Robert Christgau described the song as "the most eloquently eclectic Beatle tribute ever recorded". Christopher Connelly of Rolling Stone noted it was "easily Cheap Trick's best slow song since 'Take Me I'm Yours' and a stunning example of what this band can do when it forgets about being commercial in these days when heavy metal rules the world." Connelly also commented on the song's "smashing guitar attack" and noted the similarity of the song's middle eight to that of The Beatles' "While My Guitar Gently Weeps."  Classic Rock History critic Michael Quinn rated it Cheap Trick's 5th best song, saying that it features "a nice harmony between Zander’s voice and Nielsen’s guitar" and also commenting on the resemblance of the middle eight to "While My Guitar Gently Weeps".  Classic Rock critic Malcolm Dome rated it as Cheap Trick's 9th greatest song, saying that it effectively combines their "eccentric" 1970s style with their more commercial 1980s style.

In a review of the 1996 box set Sex, America, Cheap Trick, Billboard commented: "Cheap Trick never ceased producing the occasional Beatlesque gem, such as "If You Want My Love"..." In the 2007 book Shake Some Action: The Ultimate Power Pop Guide, a section on Cheap Trick featured reviews on the top 20 stand-out tracks from the band. "If You Want My Love" was included, with the author John M. Borack writing: "Best ballad of the '80s anyone? For sheer Lennon-meets-McCartney-head-on splendor, it's damned hard to top. One of Zander's finest leads ever, punctuated by his oh-so-Paulie 'woooos'."

Track listing
7" single
"If You Want My Love" - 3:35
"Four Letter Word" - 3:39

7" single (Dutch edition)
"If You Want My Love" - 3:06
"Four Letter Word" - 3:41

7" single (Spanish promo)
"If You Want My Love" - 3:35
"Four Letter Word" - 3:37

Chart performance

Weekly charts

Year-end charts

Certifications and sales

Personnel
Cheap Trick
 Robin Zander - lead vocals, rhythm guitar
 Rick Nielsen - lead guitar, backing vocals
 Jon Brant - bass, backing vocals
 Bun E. Carlos - drums, percussion

Additional personnel
 Roy Thomas Baker - producer
 Ian Taylor – engineer
 Paul Klingberg – assistant
 George Marino – mastering
 David Michael Kennedy – photographer

References

1982 singles
Cheap Trick songs
Songs written by Rick Nielsen
Song recordings produced by Roy Thomas Baker
Epic Records singles
1982 songs